Peter Kuhfeld (born 4 March 1952) is an English figurative painter.  He was born in Cheltenham and is married to the English figurative painter Cathryn Kuhfeld, née Showan.  They have two daughters who have often appeared in their paintings.

Biography
Kuhfeld is the only child of a German prisoner of war and an English classical pianist.  Between 1972 and 1976 he studied at Leicester School of Art. He worked from 1976 to 1978 at Rugby School of Art, where he gave lessons in drawing and painting, before securing a place at the prestigious Royal Academy School of Art.  During 1977-80 Kuhfeld studied under the painter Peter Greenham CBE, RA.  In 1978 he was created a Freeman of the Worshipful Company of Painters.

While at the Royal Academy Schools Kuhfeld won various notable scholarships and prizes:
1978-79 David Murray Landscape Prize; 1979 Royal Academy of Art Silver Medal for Drawing, Royal College of Surgeons Dooley Prize for Anatomical Drawing; 1980 Elizabeth Greenshield Foundation Scholarship and Richard Ford Scholarship for study in Spain.

In 1985 the New Grafton Gallery in London gave Kuhfeld his first major exhibition, with the painter Christa Ga, which helped establish him as one of the up-and-coming members of the New English Art movement.  In 1986 Kuhfeld was elected to membership of the New English Art Club.  In 1992 he became an elected member of the Royal Society of Portrait Painters, which he resigned in 2005. In 2009, he unveiled a portrait of Harry Patch, the oldest man in Europe and last surviving World War I soldier, which Kuhfeld called "a privilege" and "was struck by this extraordinary man".

In 2012, he was commissioned by Charles, Prince of Wales to paint the royal wedding of Prince William, Duke of Cambridge and Catherine, Duchess of Cambridge. Prince Charles has been a patron of his and Kuhfeld painted portraits of Prince William and Prince Harry in 1986.

Exhibitions
 1985   Christa Ga and Peter Kuhfeld, New Grafton Gallery, London
 1987   Royal Academy Schools Tradition, Highgate Gallery, London
 1987   The Long Perspective, National Trust Foundation for Art, Agnew's London
 1987   The New English Art Club, W.H.Patterson, London
 1988   A Personal Choice, Sir Brinsley Ford, The Fermoy Gallery, King's Lynn Festival
 1989   Salute to Turner, National Trust Foundation for Art, Agnew's London
 1989   The Discerning Eye, Mall Galleries, London
 1990   Accompanied the Prince and Princess of Wales to Nigeria, Cameroon and Tunisia
 1990   Accompanied the Prince and Princess of Wales to Japan
 1991   Five New English Painters, W.H. Patterson, London
 1992   The Order of Merit: New Portrait Drawings commissioned by Queen Elizabeth II, National Portrait Gallery (London)
 1993   Accompanied the Prince of Wales to Poland
 1994   Venice in Peril, W.H. Patterson, London
 1994   Peter Greenham CBE, RA. Memorial Exhibition, Christie's, London
 1995   Centenary National Trust Foundation for Art, Christie's, London
 1995   The Discerning Eye, Mall Galleries, London
 1996   NEAC 2000, The Fine Art Society, London
 1997   The Discerning Eye, Mall Galleries, London
 1998   Royal Society of Portrait Painters at the National Portrait Gallery, London
 1998   30th Anniversary, New Grafton Gallery, London
 1998   Princes as Patrons, National Gallery of Wales, Cardiff
 1998   Travels with the Prince, Hampton Court Palace
 1999   Variations on a Theme, W.H. Patterson, London
 1999   Royal Society of Portrait Painters, National Portrait Gallery, London
 1999   Discerning Eye, Mall Galleries, London
 1999   Christmas Exhibition – Seven pictures of Pulteney Bridge, Bath, W.H. Patterson, London
 2000   People's Portraits, Royal Society of Portrait Painters, London
 2000   Millennium, W.H. Patterson, London
 2000   Royal Society of Portrait Painters, at the National Portrait Gallery, London
 2002   New English Art Club at the Royal Academy, Royal Academy of Arts, London
 2002   Summer Exhibition, Royal Academy of Arts, London
 2002   Royal Society of Portrait Painters, winner of H.R.H. The Prince of Wales’ Prize for Portrait Drawing
 2002   Royal Society of Portrait Painters, at the National Portrait Gallery, London
 2003   The View, Waterstones, London
 2003   Summer Exhibition, Royal Academy of Arts, London
 2003   Petley Fine Art, Monte Carlo
 2004   Drawing, Petley Fine Art, London
 2004   Accompanied the Prince of Wales to Iran, Iraq and Saudi Arabia
 2004   Cathryn and Peter Kuhfeld, New Grafton Gallery, London
 2005   Petley Fine Art, London
 2005   John Ward, Friends and Family, Faversham, Kent
 2006   Drawing, Petley Fine Art, London
 2006   John Cornforth Memorial exhibition, Sotheby's, London

References

 Royal Society of Portrait Painters
 New English Art Club

External links
 Peter Kuhfeld at Brian Sinfield Art Gallery

1952 births
Living people
20th-century English painters
21st-century English painters
English male painters
20th-century English male artists
21st-century English male artists